The 2005 North American Solar Challenge (NASC) was an intercollegiate solar car race on July 17–27, 2005. The event was won by the University of Michigan, with the University of Minnesota finishing less than 12 minutes behind them, in what was both the longest and most closely contested race in the history of the event. The race was notable for being the first solar car race to cross an international border.  It was the 8th American national championship solar car race held.

Route
Day 1: Sun, July 17: Start in Austin, Texas; finish in Weatherford, TX.
Day 2: Mon, July 18: Start in Weatherford, TX.
Day 3: Tue, July 19: Must reach Broken Arrow, Oklahoma checkpoint.
Day 4: Wed, July 20: Must reach Topeka, Kansas checkpoint; must reach Omaha, Nebraska checkpoint.
Day 5: Thu, July 21: Must reach Sioux Falls, South Dakota checkpoint.
Day 6: Fri, July 22: Must reach Fargo, North Dakota checkpoint.
Day 7: Sat, July 23: Finish in Winnipeg, Manitoba.
Day 8: Sun, July 24: Start in Winnipeg, MB; must reach Brandon, MB checkpoint.
Day 9: Mon, July 25: Must reach Regina, Saskatchewan checkpoint; 
Day 10: Tue, July 26: Finish in Medicine Hat, Alberta.
Day 11: Wed, July 27: Start in Medicine Hat, AB; Finish in Calgary, AB.

Results

References

Solar car races